My Five Wives is an American reality television series broadcast on TLC that began airing in 2013. The show documents the life of a polygamist family, which includes wife Paulie Caroline, her husband, their four other wives, and their 25 children. The family began the series living in an undisclosed city outside of Salt Lake City, Utah, due to fear of prosecution for polygamy. Towns shown in the show are Payson, Spanish Fork, and Provo. The five wives in order of marriage are: Paulie, Robyn, Rosemary, Nonie, and Rhonda.

Cast
 Brady Frank Williams
 Paulie Caroline 
 Robyn Florentine
 Rosemary Jennifer 
 Ramona "Nonie" Darleen 
 Rhonda Lee

Episodes

Series overview

Season 1 (2014)

Season 2 (2014)

See also
Sister Wives, another reality TV series on TLC about a polygamist family
Seeking Sister Wife, another reality TV series on TLC about polygamists

References

TLC (TV network) original programming
2013 American television series debuts
2010s American reality television series
Works about polygamy in Mormonism
Documentaries about polygamy
Television series about families
Television series about polygamy
Polygamy in the United States
Women in Utah